This traditional list does not accord strictly with human thalamic anatomy.

Nuclear groups of the thalamus include:
anterior nuclear group 
anteroventral nucleus 
anterodorsal nucleus
anteromedial nucleus
superficial ("lateral dorsal")
medial nuclear group (or dorsomedial nucleus)
parvocellular part
magnocellular part
midline nuclear group or paramedian
paratenial nucleus
paraventricular nucleus of thalamus
reuniens nucleus
rhomboidal nucleus
Intralaminar nuclear group (Intralaminar nuclei)
anterior (rostral) group
paracentral nucleus
central lateral nucleus
central medial nucleus
posterior (caudal) intralaminar group
centromedian nucleus
parafascicular nucleus
lateral nuclear group in fact a false entity replaced by
posterior region 
pulvinar
anterior pulvinar nucleus
lateral pulvinar nucleus
medial pulvinar nucleus
inferior pulvinar nucleus 
lateral posterior nucleus belongs to pulvinar 
(lateral dorsal nucleus) belongs to anterior group
ventral nuclear group
ventral anterior nucleus 
ventral lateral nucleus
ventral intermediate nucleus 
ventral posterior nucleus or ventrobasal complex
ventral posterolateral 
ventral posteromedial 
ventral intermediate nucleus 
metathalamus no longer used for the geniculate group
medial geniculate body 
lateral geniculate body
thalamic reticular nucleus part of the ventral thalamus

Related topic
 Human brain
 Outline of the human nervous system
 List of regions in the human brain

External links
 Diagram at University of Memphis

Thalamic nuclei